Kim Shin-jo (born June 2, 1942) is one of two survivors of the 31-person team of North Korean commandos sent to assassinate the then-president of South Korea, Park Chung-hee, in the Blue House raid in January 1968.

The only other survivor, Pak Jae-gyong, made it back to the North, but Kim Shin-jo was captured by South Korean forces. He was interrogated for a year by the South Korean authorities before being released and becoming a citizen of South Korea in 1970. South Korea claimed when North Korean authorities found out that he became a South Korean citizen, his parents were executed and his relatives purged by North Korean authorities.

Kim later became a pastor at Sungrak Sambong church in Gyeonggi-do. He has a wife and two children.

References

Living people
1942 births
People from Chongjin
North Korean military personnel
North Korean assassins
North Korean Christians
Sole survivors
Failed assassins
North Korean defectors
Converts to Christianity
South Korean pastors
South Korean Christians